Niobrarateuthis is an extinct genus of large cephalopod from the Cretaceous. It is closely related to the Cretaceous Tusoteuthis and the Jurassic Muensterella.

See also

Cephalopod size

References

Prehistoric cephalopod genera
Cretaceous cephalopods
Late Cretaceous cephalopods of North America